Joshua Bassett (born 2000) is an American actor and singer.

Joshua Bassett may also refer to:
 Joshua Bassett (academic) or Basset (c. 1641 – c.1720), master of Sidney Sussex College, Cambridge
 Josh Bassett (born Joshua Marcus Andrew Bassett; 1992), English rugby union player